Tseng Hsiang-chun(), born August 8, 1998 in Taipei City, Taiwan, is a Taiwanese professional basketball player for the Taipei Fubon Braves of the P. LEAGUE+ and ASEAN Basketball League.

College career

Professional career

Taipei Fubon Braves

First season 
On May 26, 2020, Tseng was signed with the Taipei Fubon Braves after graduating from Fu Jen Catholic University. Tseng's debut on October 17, 2020 when Taipei Fubon Braves against Hsinchu JKO Lioneers, he set the double-double record for the first time (11 points and 18 rebounds).

Career statistics

P. LEAGUE+

Regular season

College

Awards and honors

College 
 Taiwan University Basketball Association Blocks leader (2018, 2019)
 Taiwan University Basketball Association Rebounds leader (2019)
 Taiwan University Basketball Association Scoring leader (2020)

References 

1998 births
Living people
Sportspeople from Taipei
Taiwanese men's basketball players
Fu Jen Catholic University alumni
Basketball players at the 2018 Asian Games
Taipei Fubon Braves players
Chinese Taipei men's national basketball team players
P. League+ players